George Francis may refer to:
 George Grant Francis (1814–1882), Welsh antiquary
 George Francis (Assyrian) (1970–1999), Assyrian martyr
 George Francis (cricketer) (1897–1942), West Indian cricketer
 George Francis (footballer) (1934–2014), English football (soccer) player
 George Francis (rugby union) (born 1998), Australian rugby union player
 George Francis (Robot Wars), chief engineer of the "Chaos 2" team from the BBC television series Robot Wars
 George Francis (suspected criminal) (1940–2003), British man suspected of involvement in the 1983 Brink's-Mat robbery
 George Francis (trainer) (c. 1929–2002), British boxing trainer
 George B. Francis (1883–1967), U.S. Representative from New York
 George William Francis (1800–1865), English botanical and general science writer

See also